Koromogawa No.4 Dam  is a rockfill dam located in Iwate Prefecture in Japan. The dam is used for flood control. The catchment area of the dam is 3.9 km2. The dam impounds about 7  ha of land when full and can store 570 thousand cubic meters of water. The construction of the dam was started on 1982 and completed in 1995.

See also
List of dams in Japan

References

Dams in Iwate Prefecture